Devil's Elbow is a 1972 album by Doug Kershaw.

Reception
The album was received as a swing towards psychedelic music. Stereo Review did not welcome Kershaw's move from Cajun fiddler to Nashville singer.

Track listing
"Super Cowboy" (Joe Allen)
"Devil's Elbow" (Don Wayne)
"Get a Little Dirt on Your Hands" (Bill Anderson)
"Jamestown Ferry" (Bobby Borchers, Mack Vickery)
"Billy Bayou" (Roger Miller)
"Lou'siana Sun" (Doug Kershaw)
"You Don't Want My Love" (Roger Miller)
"Honky Tonk Wine" (Mack Vickery)
"Fisherman's Luck" (Doug Kershaw)
"Sally Was a Good Old Girl" (Harlan Howard)
"I Like Babies" (Doug Kershaw, Don Wayne)
"(Had Not Been For) My Sally Jo" (Doug Kershaw, Buddy Killen)

Personnel
Doug Kershaw - fiddle
Jimmy Colvard, Johnny Christopher, Troy Seals - guitar
Curly Chalker, Stu Basore - pedal steel
Joe Allen, Tommy Cogbill - bass
Bobby Emmons, Bobby Woods - keyboards
Charlie McCoy - harmonica, tuba
Bill Ackerman, Jerry Carrigan, Karl Himmel, Kenny Malone - drums
Buddy Killen - percussion, arrangements
The Jordanaires, Millie Kirkham - backing vocals
Technical
Ernie Winfrey - engineer
Ed Thrasher - art direction
Kevin Smart - cover photography

References

1972 albums
Warner Records albums